The Random Hills are a group of rugged hills in Victoria Land, Antarctica. Bounded on the west by Campbell Glacier and on the east by Tinker Glacier and Wood Bay, centered about 15 nautical miles (28 km) north-northwest of Mount Melbourne, they were named by the Southern Party of the New Zealand Geological Survey Antarctic Expedition (NZGSAE), 1966–67, because of the random orientation of the ridges which comprise the feature.

The Random Hills are part of the Melbourne Volcanic Province of the McMurdo Volcanic Group. K–Ar or Rb–Sr dating has given ages of 12.63 ± 0.17 million years and 12.43 ± 0.16 million years for Random Hills hawaiite.

Features

 Clausnitzer Glacier
 Mount McGee
 Harrow Peaks

References

Hills of Victoria Land
Borchgrevink Coast
Volcanoes of Victoria Land
Miocene volcanoes